The following television stations operate on virtual channel 12 in Canada:

 CFCF-DT in Montreal, Quebec
 CFTF-DT-3 in Cabano, Quebec
 CHAU-DT-9 in L'Anse-à-Valleau, Quebec
 CHEX-DT in Peterborough, Ontario
 CHKL-DT-2 in Vernon, British Columbia
 CHNB-DT in Saint John, New Brunswick
 CIFG-DT in Prince George, British Columbia
 CIII-DT-12 in Sault Ste. Marie, Ontario
 CIVA-DT in Val d'Or, Quebec
 CIVF-DT in Sept-Iles, Quebec
 CKTV-DT in Saguenay, Quebec

12 virtual TV stations in Canada